Davit Janelidze (born 9 February 1973) is a Georgian former football player.

External links
 

1973 births
Living people
Footballers from Georgia (country)
Georgia (country) international footballers
Expatriate footballers from Georgia (country)
Expatriate footballers in Germany
FC Dinamo Tbilisi players
Eintracht Braunschweig players
FC Alazani Gurjaani players
Association football goalkeepers